Bogdan Norčič (19 September 1953, Kranj – 4 April 2004, Cerklje na Gorenjskem) was a Yugoslavian ski jumper of Slovene ethnicity. He competed at the 1976 and 1980 Winter Olympics.

Career
On 20 March 1977, he crashed as trial jumper at ski jumping world record distance at 181 metres (554 ft) back home on Velikanka bratov Gorišek K165 in Planica, Yugoslavia. Same distance was matched 6 years later by Pavel Ploc at Harrachov and over-jumped by Matti Nykänen at Oberstdorf 7 years after.

World Cup

Standings

Invalid ski jumping world record
This was the first ever ski jump over 180 metres in history.

 Not recognized! Crash at world record distance.

References

External links

1953 births
2004 deaths
Slovenian male ski jumpers
Yugoslav male ski jumpers
Ski jumpers at the 1976 Winter Olympics
Ski jumpers at the 1980 Winter Olympics
Olympic ski jumpers of Yugoslavia
Sportspeople from Kranj